Collinsia linearis is a species of flowering plant in the plantain family known by the common name narrowleaf blue-eyed Mary.

It is native to the coniferous forests of the Klamath Mountains in northern California and southern Oregon sometimes on serpentine soils. It has also been seen in the Sierra Nevada.

Description
Collinsia linearis is an annual herb producing an erect stem 10 to 40 centimeters tall with narrow leaves turned under at the edges.

The inflorescence is a series of nodes, each bearing 1 to 5 flowers. Each flower arises on a pedicel coated in glandular hairs. The corolla of the flower angles sharply from the calyx of sepals. It is white to purple-tinted to deep purple-blue, and sometimes bicolored. There are two upper lobes and three lower lobes, the middle lower lobe forming a pouch.

External links
Jepson Manual Treatment of Collinsia linearis
Collinsia linearis — U.C. Photo gallery

linearis
Flora of California
Flora of Oregon
Flora of the Klamath Mountains
Flora of the Sierra Nevada (United States)
Plants described in 1880
Flora without expected TNC conservation status